is a Japanese manga series written and illustrated by Kōhei Horikoshi. It was first published in 2011 as a one-shot manga in Shueisha's Jump Next!, before being serialized Weekly Shōnen Jump from May to September 2012, with its chapters collected in two tankōbon volumes. The story follows Astro, a dim-witted but kind young man from the slums, on a journey across the planet of Industria. He meets the prince, who looks and sounds like him, and, following a certain incident, ends up becoming the prince who defends Industria with his weapon called the Org.

In North America, the series was licensed for English release by Viz Media, who published it on the digital manga anthology, Weekly Shonen Jump, and released its two volumes in print in March and April 2013.

Plot
On the planet of Industria where aliens fight with humans, a young slum dweller Astro works tirelessly to feed his adopted brothers and sisters. One day, after an argument with his boss, Astro saves him from the alien Archduke of Endra.  Despite this, Astro is fired. Distraught, he accidentally meets his doppelganger, the runaway Prince Barrage of Industria, who wants Astro to act as his substitute. Astro decides to assume the role of the prince of Industria to prevent arousing suspicion from enemy aliens and protect his beloved "family".

Characters
 
Growing up in the slums of the capital as an orphan, Astro is extremely dedicated to his adopted family, working long hours for food and shelter. He believes so strongly in the value of family that he is willing to help any family member in need, at times forgetting his assumed identity as the Prince much to Tiamat's displeasure. He later finds out that he is the true Prince Barrage.
 
The loyal vice-captain of the military forces under the Planetary King of Industria. He becomes  Astro's companion and personally trains him in swordsmanship throughout their journey. Tiamat harbors a severe phobia of women, going to great lengths to avoid them.
 
The son of the Planetary King of Industria and the prince of Industria. He very closely resembles  Astro down to the same hair color, height, and voice, yet both have different personalities. Unlike Astro, Prince Barrage is arrogant, spoiled, and abusive to his own servants, such as Jino. He was killed instantly by a laser when a mysterious sniper thought he was Astro, not seeing the resemblance at all, who was going to do whatever he wanted free of all responsibilities. It is later revealed that he is an evil twin or dark energy counterpart of Astro, who is the true Prince Barrage.
 
The current ruler of Industria and the former wielder of the Org.

A young girl who seeks revenge for her adoptive mother's death at the hands of aliens. She lives in Masayle, a place of strategic importance to the capital of Industria.

Publication
Barrage is written and illustrated by Kōhei Horikoshi. The series was originally published on August 12, 2011 as a one-shot manga in the seasonally published Jump NEXT!. It was then serialized in Shueisha's Weekly Shōnen Jump from May 21 to September 10, 2012, Shueisha compiled the individual chapters into two tankōbon volumes published on October 4 and November 2, 2012.

In North America, the series was published in English by Viz Media on its digital manga magazine Weekly Shonen Jump (formerly known as Weekly Shonen Jump Alpha) beginning on June 4, 2012, with chapters being released two weeks behind the Japanese publication. The volumes of the series were released on March 5 and April 2, 2013.

Volume list

References

External links

2012 manga
Adventure anime and manga
Extraterrestrials in anime and manga
Fantasy anime and manga
Shōnen manga
Shueisha manga
Viz Media manga
Works based on The Prince and the Pauper